The British National Fencing Museum is the national museum for Great Britain for the sport and martial art of fencing.

The museum opened during the year 2002 and is located at Hanley Swan in the locality of Malvern, Worcestershire, England.

See also
Bramshill House
British Fencing Association

References

2002 establishments in England
Museums established in 2002
Museums in Worcestershire
Sports museums in England
Fencing in the United Kingdom